The Roman Catholic Archdiocese of Tuxtla is a Metropolitan Archdiocese based in Tuxtla, Chiapas, Mexico. It is responsible for the suffragan dioceses of Tapachula and Las Casas. Pope Benedict XVI elevated it to the level of archdiocese on 25 November 2006.

Masses in Tzotzil and Tzeltal languages 
In 2013, Pope Francis approved translations of the prayers for Mass and the celebration of sacraments into Tzotzil and Tzeltal. The translations include "the prayers used for Mass, marriage, baptisms, confirmations, confessions, ordinations and the anointing of the sick Bishop Arizmendi said Oct. 6 that the texts, which took approximately eight years to translate, would be used in his diocese and the neighboring Archdiocese of Tuxtla. Mass has been celebrated in the diocese in recent years with the assistance of translators—except during homilies—Bishop Arizmendi said in an article in the newspaper La Jornada.

Bishops

Ordinaries 
José Trinidad Sepúlveda Ruiz-Velasco (1965–1988), appointed Bishop of San Juan de los Lagos, Jalisco  
Felipe Aguirre Franco (1988–2000), appointed Coadjutor Archbishop of Acapulco, Guerrero
José Luis Chávez Botello (2001–2003), appointed Archbishop of Antequera, Oaxaca
Rogelio Cabrera López (2004–2012), appointed Archbishop of Monterrey, Nuevo León
Fabio Martinez Castilla (2013–present); formerly Bishop, Roman Catholic Diocese of Ciudad Lázaro Cárdenas

Auxiliary bishops
Felipe Aguirre Franco (1974–1988), appointed Bishop here
José Luis Mendoza Corzo (2007–

Other priests of this diocese who became bishops
Óscar Armando Campos Contreras, appointed Auxiliary Bishop of Antequera, Oaxaca in 2006
José Alberto González Juárez, appointed Bishop of Tuxtepec, Oaxaca in 2015
Guadalupe Antonio Ruíz Urquín, appointed Prelate of Huautla, Oaxaca in 2020

See also 
List of Roman Catholic archdioceses in México

References

External links 

  Official Blog at Blogger 

Roman Catholic dioceses in Mexico
Roman Catholic ecclesiastical provinces in Mexico
Roman Catholic Ecclesiastical Province of Tuxtla Gutiérrez
Christian organizations established in 1964
Roman Catholic dioceses and prelatures established in the 20th century
Tuxtla Gutiérrez